Mary Bownes OBE FRSE FRES FRSB is an English molecular and developmental biologist; she is Vice Principal Community Engagement and Emerita Professor of Developmental Biology at the University of Edinburgh. She has taught genetics, molecular biology and developmental biology at all levels and was previously Head of the Institute of Cell and Molecular Biology at the University from 1998-2001.

Education and research career
Bownes was awarded her Ph.D by the University of Sussex 1973 for her thesis on determination in drosophila embryos and continued to research oogenesis and embryogenesis in drosophila over the next years at the University of Freiburg, University of California, Irvine and University of Essex before settling at the University of Edinburgh in 1979. She was appointed Professor of Developmental Biology in 1993 and Head of the Institute of Cell and Molecular Biology in 1998.

Current positions held
Bownes is an External Advisor to the Royal Society Evaluation Panel, a board member of the Royal Zoological Society of Scotland, Director of the Scottish Initiative for Biotechnology Education, Director of the Edinburgh Beltane and a member of the Royal Society of Edinburgh Meeting Committee.

Previous positions
Bownes's previous roles have included being a member of the Biotechnology and Biological Sciences Research Council Strategy Board, and serving on the boards of the Scottish Association for Marine Science and Highlands and Islands Enterprise.

References

English biologists
Developmental biologists
English molecular biologists
Fellows of the Royal Society of Edinburgh
1948 births
Alumni of the University of Sussex
Academics of the University of Edinburgh
Scientists from Devon
Living people
University of Freiburg alumni
University of California alumni
Place of birth missing (living people)
Fellows of the Royal Society of Biology
Fellows of the Royal Entomological Society
English women biologists
Women molecular biologists
20th-century British biologists
20th-century British women scientists
21st-century British biologists
21st-century British women scientists